The Bahia porcupine (Coendou insidiosus), is a New World porcupine species in the family Erethizontidae endemic to the Atlantic Forest of southeastern Brazil. It was formerly sometimes assigned to Sphiggurus, a genus no longer recognized since genetic studies showed it to be polyphyletic. Sphiggurus pallidus, formerly considered a separate species but known from two young specimens only, is a synonym of this species.

References

Natureserve.org

Coendou
Rodents of South America
Mammals of Brazil
Endemic fauna of Brazil
Mammals described in 1818
Taxa named by Ignaz von Olfers